
This is a timeline of Burmese or Myanmar history, comprising important legal and territorial changes and political events in Burma and its predecessor states.  To read about the background to these events, see History of Burma. See also the list of Burmese leaders.

 Millennia: 2nd BCE–1st BCE1st–2nd3rd

Centuries: 15th BCE14th BCE13th BCE12th BCE11th BCE10th BCE9th BCE8th BCE7th BCE6th BCE5th BCE4th BCE3rd BCE2nd BCE1st BCE

15th century BCE

14th century BCE

13th century BCE

12th century BCE

10th century BCE

9th century BCE

8th century BCE

7th century BCE

6th century BCE

5th century BCE

4th century BCE

3rd century BCE

2nd century BCE

1st century BCE 

 Centuries: 1st2nd3rd4th5th6th7th8th9th10th11th12th13th14th15th16th17th18th19th20th

1st century

2nd century

3rd century

4th century

5th century

6th century

7th century

8th century

9th century

10th century

11th century

12th century

13th century

14th century

15th century

16th century

17th century

18th century

19th century

20th century

21st century

See also

History of Myanmar
List of Burmese monarchs
Burmese monarchs' family tree

Notes

References

Bibliography
 
 
 
 
 
 
 
 
 
 
 
 

 
Burmese
Myanmar history-related lists